John Christopher Williams   (born 24 April 1941) is an Australian virtuosic classical guitarist renowned for his ensemble playing as well as his interpretation and promotion of the modern classical guitar repertoire. In 1973, he shared a Grammy Award in the Best Chamber Music Performance category with fellow guitarist Julian Bream for Together (released in the US as Julian and John (Works by Lawes, Carulli, Albéniz, Granados)). Guitar historian Graham Wade has said that "John is perhaps the most technically accomplished guitarist the world has seen."

Early life 
John Williams is an only child who was born on 24 April 1941 in Melbourne to an English father, Len Williams, who bought John, at age 4, his first guitar with a modified neck. Len would later found the Spanish Guitar Centre in London. His mother Melaan (née Ah Ket) was the daughter of William Ah Ket, the first Australian barrister of Chinese heritage. In 1952, the family moved to England where he attended Friern Barnet Grammar School, London. Williams was initially taught guitar by his father, who was a musically disciplined and accomplished classical guitarist. From the age of 11, Williams attended summer courses with Andrés Segovia at the Accademia Musicale Chigiana in Siena, Italy. He attended the Royal College of Music in London, from 1956 to 1959, studying piano because the college did not have a guitar section. In 1958 at 17, he made his musical debut performing publicly at London's Wigmore Hall. Upon his college graduation he was invited to create and then to run their guitar department for its first two years of life. Williams maintains links with the college (and also with the Royal Northern College of Music in Manchester).

Classical guitarist 
Williams' first professional performance was at the Wigmore Hall in London on 6 November 1958. Since then, he has been performing throughout the world and has made regular appearances on radio and TV. He has extended the repertoire by commissioning guitar concertos from composers such as Stephen Dodgson, André Previn, Patrick Gowers, Richard Harvey, and Steve Gray. Williams has recorded albums of duets with fellow guitarists Julian Bream and Paco Peña.

Williams is a visiting professor and honorary member of the Royal Academy of Music in London.

Williams mostly uses Greg Smallman guitars, after using Spanish Fleta during the 1970s.

Thoughts on guitar education and teaching 
Williams has expressed his frustration and concern with guitar education and teaching, that it is too one-sided i.e. focusing only on solo playing, instead of giving guitar students a better education including ensemble playing, sight-reading and a focus on phrasing and tone production and variation. Williams notes that "students [are] preoccupied with fingerings and not notes, much less sounds"; some are able "to play [...] difficult solo works from memory", but "have a very poor sense of ensemble [playing] or timing". He notes that students play works from the solo repertoire that are often too difficult, so that the teachers often put more "emphasis [...] on getting through the notes rather than playing the real substance of each note". To encourage phrasing, tone production and all-around musicianship, Williams arranges for students to play together in ensembles, choosing works from the existing classical music repertoire, such as the "easier Haydn String Quartets".

Other musical genres 
Although Williams is best known as a classical guitarist, he has explored many different musical genres. Between 1978 and 1984 he was a member of the fusion group Sky. He is also a composer and arranger. At the invitation of producer Martin Lewis he created a highly acclaimed classical-rock fusion duet with rock guitarist Pete Townshend of The Who on Townshend's anthemic "Won't Get Fooled Again" for the 1979 Amnesty International benefit show The Secret Policeman's Ball. The duet featured on the resulting album and the film version of the show – bringing Williams to the broader attention of the rock audience.

Williams recorded "Cavatina" by Stanley Myers. The piece originally included only the first few measures but, at Williams' request, it was rewritten for guitar and expanded by Myers. After this transformation it was used for a film, The Walking Stick (1970). In 1973, Cleo Laine wrote lyrics and recorded it as the song "He Was Beautiful" accompanied by Williams. The guitar version became a worldwide hit single when it was used as the theme tune to the Oscar-winning film The Deer Hunter (1978).

Personal life 
Williams and his third wife, artist Kathy Panama (whom he married on New Year's Eve 2000), reside in London (Hampstead) and Cornwall. He has a daughter, Kate Williams, who is an established jazz pianist. He also has a son, Charlie, by his second wife, the television presenter Sue Cook.

Discography

Awards and recognitions 
He was appointed an Officer of the Order of the British Empire (OBE) in 1980, and an Officer of the Order of Australia (AO) in the 1987 Australia Day Honours, "For service to music".

Bernard Heinze Memorial Award
The Sir Bernard Heinze Memorial Award is given to a person who has made an outstanding contribution to music in Australia.

|-
| 2013 || John Williams|| Sir Bernard Heinze Memorial Award ||  
|-

Brit Awards

|-
| 1983 || John Williams for Portrait of John Williams || Best Classical Recording ||  
|-

Brit Awards

! 
|-
| 2012 || British Academy of Songwriters, Composers and Authors || BASCA Gold Badge Award||  ||
|-

Edison Classical Music Awards

! 
|-
| 2007 || John Williams || Oeuvreprijs || 
|-

Grammy Awards

|-
| 1973 || Julian Bream & John Christopher Williams for ''Julian and John (Works by Lawes, Carulli, Albéniz, Granados) || Grammy Award for Best Chamber Music Performance ||  
|-

Further reading 
 Michael O'Toole, "John Williams: An Evaluation of his Impact Upon the Culture of the Classical Guitar". Doctoral thesis, Technological University Dublin, 2018. doi:10.21427/D70129

 Interview (1983), by Paul Magnussen

References 

Australian classical guitarists
Australian male guitarists
Musicians from London
Musicians from Melbourne
Australian emigrants to England
Australian expatriates in England
1941 births
Living people
Alumni of the Royal College of Music
Academics of the Royal College of Music
Grammy Award winners
Academics of the Royal Academy of Music
Honorary Members of the Royal Academy of Music
People educated at Friern Barnet Grammar School
Fly Records artists
Sony Classical Records artists
Australian people of English descent
Australian people of Chinese descent
Sky (English/Australian band) members